Statistics of Kuwaiti Premier League in the 1976–77 season.

Overview
Al Kuwait Kaifan won the championship.

References
RSSSF

1976–77
1976–77 in Asian association football leagues
football